Breitenbush Lake is a  water body on a high plateau north of Mount Jefferson in the Cascade Range in the U.S. state of Oregon. The lake, fed by seepage and small creeks, is part of the North Fork Breitenbush River watershed.

Forest Road 4220 runs by the lake. Breitenbush Lake Campground, maintained by the United States Forest Service, has 20 sites and a vault toilet but no garbage service. Canoes are allowed on the lake but not motorboats.

Forest Road 4220 has been described as rough at best, and heavy snow keeps it closed to most traffic from mid-October through the end of June, usually.  When the road is snow-covered, visitors can still use it to reach the lake on snowshoes, cross-country skis, or snowmobiles.

See also
 List of lakes in Oregon

References

Lakes of Oregon
Lakes of Marion County, Oregon
Mount Hood National Forest